Mallikpur Union is an Union Parishad under Lohagara Upazila of Narail District in the division of Khulna, Bangladesh. It has an area of 32.22 km2 (12.44 sq mi) and a population of 22,195.

References

Unions of Lohagara Upazila, Narail
Unions of Narail District
Unions of Khulna Division